Smith v Croft (No 2) [1988] Ch 114 is a UK company law case concerning derivative claims. Its principle that in allowing a derivative claim to continue the court will have regard to the majority of the minority's views has been codified in Companies Act 2006, section 263(4).

Facts
Minority shareholders claimed to recover money paid away contrary to the financial assistance prohibition (now found at section 678 of the Companies Act 2006) and being ultra vires. They had 14% of the company's shares, the defendants held 63%, and another shareholder, who did not want litigation, held 21%.

Judgment
Knox J held that if the claimants were a minority even after the wrongdoers were taken out of the equation, then there is no right to sue, even with a Foss v Harbottle exception. Independence is a question of fact. He followed Burland v Earle in Lord Davey’s dicta that shareholders cannot have a bigger right to sue than the company with its procedural and substantive limitations.

Significance
The case was cited in the Law Commission Shareholder Remedies Report in regards to the amount of court time involved:

See also

UK company law

Notes

References

United Kingdom company case law
1988 in case law
1988 in British law